Robert John Renzetti is an American animator and author. Renzetti is known for creating My Life as a Teenage Robot and the Oh Yeah! Cartoons series Mina and the Count for Nickelodeon, directing Dexter's Laboratory, The Powerpuff Girls, and Samurai Jack for Cartoon Network and serving as the animation director of Sym-Bionic Titan. He was also the supervising producer on the Disney Channel animated television series Gravity Falls and  an executive producer on Big City Greens. He most recently served as story editor and co-executive producer on Kid Cosmic for Netflix and is currently writing his first original novel entitled The Horrible Bag of Terrible Things to be published by Penguin Workshop, an imprint of Penguin Random House.

Early life
Renzetti, born in Chicago and raised in Addison, Illinois, was an art history major at the University of Illinois at Urbana-Champaign. After graduating from Illinois, Renzetti attended the animation program at Columbia College Chicago for one year, where he was a classmate of Genndy Tartakovsky. Renzetti and Tartakovsky were then each accepted into the California Institute of the Arts, where they were roommates.

Career
After graduating from the California Institute of the Arts, Renzetti began his animating career in Spain, working on 5 episodes for Batman: The Animated Series.

Renzetti has been writer, director, and storyboard artist for several Cartoon Network shows, including 2 Stupid Dogs, Dexter's Laboratory, The Powerpuff Girls, Samurai Jack, and Foster's Home for Imaginary Friends. He won an Emmy award in 2009 for his work on Foster's Home for Imaginary Friends. During the mid-1990s, he created Mina and the Count, a series of animated shorts that premiered on the What a Cartoon! show then later aired for a short time on the similar anthology series Oh Yeah! Cartoons. In 1999, he made the short "My Neighbor Was a Teenage Robot", which also debuted on Oh Yeah! Cartoons; in 2003, My Life as a Teenage Robot, based on the short, debuted on Nickelodeon. In April 2008, he started work on Cartoon Network's The Cartoonstitute project as supervising producer.

He was story editor on My Little Pony: Friendship Is Magic for the series' first two seasons, but left in 2011, soon after the departure of the series showrunner, Lauren Faust, to work as the supervising producer on Disney's Gravity Falls. He subsequently worked on Disney's Big City Greens as one of its executive producers.

He was most recently co-executive producer on Kid Cosmic for Netflix.

Renzetti has also written four books for Disney Publishing including Dipper's and Mabel's Guide to Mystery and Nonstop Fun!, the New York Times Bestseller Gravity Falls: Journal 3, Ducktales: Solving Mysteries and Rewriting History, and Quests Of Yore.

He is currently writing his first original novel entitled The Horrible Bag of Terrible Things, which will be the first book in a trilogy to be published starting in 2023.

Filmography

Film

Television

Internet

References

External links
 
 The Teenage Roblog

American people of German descent
American people of Portuguese descent
American storyboard artists
American animated film directors
American people of Italian descent
Animators from Illinois
Artists from Chicago
California Institute of the Arts alumni
Cartoon Network Studios people
Columbia College Chicago alumni
Disney people
Showrunners
Living people
Nickelodeon Animation Studio people
People from Addison, Illinois
Primetime Emmy Award winners
University of Illinois Urbana-Champaign alumni
Hanna-Barbera people
Year of birth missing (living people)